= Corpse division =

Government department in North Korea

In North Korea, the Corpse Division (시체조,屍體組) refers to a government branch responsible for the disposition of excess corpses.
